The Vancouver Bandits are a Canadian professional basketball team based in Langley, British Columbia, that compete in the Canadian Elite Basketball League (CEBL). The Bandits play home games at Langley Events Centre, located in the Fraser Valley. They were formerly known as the Fraser Valley Bandits but after they sold the team, they changed the name.

History
Fraser Valley was first announced as part of the Canadian Elite Basketball League (CEBL) in November 2017. On July 16, 2018, the CEBL revealed their sixth inaugural team as the Fraser Valley Bandits, the logo representing a red fox wearing a bandit mask.

The team began play in the 2019 CEBL season at Abbotsford Centre. On June 27, 2019, the Bandits defeated the Saskatchewan Rattlers for their first win in franchise history. In their inaugural campaign, the Bandits finished 4-16 and did not qualify for the playoffs.

In the 2020 season, the Bandits finished the regular season 4-2 and advanced to the CEBL championship game. They ultimately fell to the Edmonton Stingers in the final 90-73.

In the 2021 season, the Bandits went 7-7 and earned a playoff berth. After defeating the Guelph Nighthawks in the quarterfinals, the Bandits lost in the semifinals to the Niagara River Lions 84-82.

On September 23, 2021, the Bandits announced that Langley Events Centre will be their home for the upcoming CEBL season, which begins May 2022.

Players

Current roster

Season-by-season record

References

External links 
 Official website

Sport in Abbotsford, British Columbia
Basketball teams in British Columbia
Basketball teams established in 2018
2018 establishments in British Columbia
Canadian Elite Basketball League teams
Langley, British Columbia (district municipality)